The Fernie Ghostriders are a junior 'B' ice hockey team based in Fernie, British Columbia, Canada. They are members of the Eddie Mountain Division of the Kootenay Conference of the Kootenay International Junior Hockey League (KIJHL). The Ghostriders play their home games at the Fernie Memorial Arena in Fernie, British Columbia. Barb Anderson is the team's president; Ty Valin is the general manager and coach. They are currently captained by Kyle Klein.

The Ghostriders joined the KIJHL in 2004 as an expansion team, after they played junior 'A' in the RMJHL from 1991–99; the AWHL from 1999–2003; and the NAHL in 2003–04. In its RMJHL history, the team has won one division playoff title as a member of the Kootenay Division from 1991–1996. In its AWHL history, the Ghostriders have won the Bourne Cup once, in 1999. In its KIJHL history, the team has won the KIJHL Championship twice, in 2007 and 2008. They won two division playoff titles as a member of the Eddie Mountain Division from 2004–2007, one playoff title as a member of the Eastern Division of the Neil Murdoch Conference from 2007–2008 and four consecutive playoff titles as a member of the Eddie Mountain Division from 2008–2012; one conference playoff title as a member of the Kootenay Conference from 2007–2012.

The Ghostriders takes its name from the Ghost Rider, an iconic shadow that appears on Mount Hosmer and is visible from the city. Mount Hosmer appears on the team's current and past logo.

Team history

1991–1999: RMJHL
The Ghostriders began in 1991 as one of the charter members of the Southern Division of the now defunct Rocky Mountain Junior Hockey League (RMJHL). The Ghostriders missed the 1993 season but came back with a vengeance, capturing the Southern Division in 1994. In 1996, after not qualifying to make the playoffs the year prior, the Ghostriders dramatically improved, making it to the Finals before losing to the history-rich Prince George Spruce Kings, four games to one. The following year, looking for vengeance after losing the RMJHL Championship the year before, the Ghostriders once again made it to the Finals, this time being swept 4–0 to the regular season lead-leading Cranbrook Colts. In 1998, after making it to the Finals two years in a row they got beat 4–1 in the semifinals by the Colts. The next year the Ghostriders made it to the last RMJHL Finals, losing to the league-leading Kimberley Dynamiters 4–2.

1999–2003: AWHL
When the RMJHL folded in 1999 the Ghostriders moved to the America West Hockey League (AWHL), winning the championship in 2000, and made an appearance in the Gold Cup National Championship. The Ghostriders were US Junior National Gold Cup bronze medal winners in 2002.

2003–2004: NAHL
They played in the North American Hockey League (NAHL) for one season before their move down, but their franchise rights were sold to a Kalamazoo, Michigan based group.

2004–2008: KIJHL – Immediate success
In 2004 the Ghostriders moved down to the Kootenay International Junior Hockey League (KIJHL), opting to be a large fish in the junior 'B' pond rather than a small fish in the junior 'A' pond. The Ghostriders immediately made a mark on the KIJHL, finishing third overall in 2006 and winning their division. The Ghostriders won the 2007 championship in come-from-behind fashion on home ice against the Nelson Leafs, but did not fare as well in the 2007 Cyclone Taylor Cup, losing all of their games. The following year they won the championship again, this time on the road in Kamloops against the Kamloops Storm and also winning bronze in the 2008 Cyclone Taylor Cup against the Victoria Cougars, the 2008 Vancouver Island Junior Hockey League (VIJHL) Brent Patterson Memorial Trophy Champions.

2008–2014: Success continues
In 2009 with the Ghostriders looking for a three-peat, the Fernie-based squad made it to the semifinals of the KIJHL, only to lose to the Nelson Leafs in the best of five series. The next year they made it all the way to the Kootenay Conference Final, but only to lose to the Nelson Leafs 4–1 in the best of seven series. In 2011 the Ghostriders once again made it to the Conference Final, but they lost 4–2 against the Castlegar Rebels. Looking for redemption after the Ghostriders lost to the Rebels in the third round of the playoffs, they hosted the 2011 Cyclone Taylor Cup, the BC junior 'B' provincial championships making it to the gold medal game, in front of a sold-out crowd at the Fernie Memorial Arena, only to lose to the VIJHL Brent Patterson Memorial Trophy Champions, the Peninsula Panthers, the same score the Ghostriders beat the Victoria Cougars for bronze in the 2008 Cyclone Taylor Cup, 5–3. The following year after winning the division playoff title and advancing to the third round of the playoffs for the seventh consecutive year, the Ghostriders lost in the Conference Final once again, this time losing to the regular season lead-leading and 2012 KIJHL Champions, the Beaver Valley Nitehawks, 4–1. In 2013, the Golden Rockets ended the Ghostriders' streak of seven consecutive playoff division titles, where they prevailed over the Ghostriders, 4–2, in the Division Finals.

2014–present

After a disappointing early exit from the 2013–14 playoffs, the Ghostriders brought Craig Mohr back to Fernie as head coach and general manager, the club's coach for the 2004–05 and 2005–06 seasons. The Ghostriders finished the 2014–15 regular season at the top of the Eddie Mountain division and second overall in the league, before defeating the Golden Rockets in the first round of playoffs. The division finals saw the Ghostriders pitched against the Kimberley Dynamiters, where an exciting series culminated in Kimberley taking the division playoff title in six games. The Dynamiters progressed to eventually win the 2014–15 KIJHL Championship and placed second in the Cyclone Taylor Cup. The 2015–16 Ghostriders roster featured a younger side than in past years, with a strong local contingent and Cole Keebler as captain. After battling a plague of injuries throughout the regular season, the Ghostriders faced the defending league champion Dynamiters in the first round of playoffs and were defeated in five games. 2016–17 was another strong season for the club winning 26 games good enough for 2nd place in the Division, but the team would fall to the Dynamiters in 6 games in the first round.

2017–18 was a struggling year for the team both on and off the ice. The team was only able to win 15 games, their worst record since their arrival to the KIJHL. The club would part ways with Craig Mohr following this season and hire Jeff Wagner the team's new Head Coach/GM. 2018–19 saw the team return to form, finishing second in the Division and fifth in the League. This was followed up by a second in Division and third in League finish in 2019–20.

Fernie Memorial Arena disaster
On Tuesday, October 17, 2017, an ammonia leak at the Fernie Memorial Arena killed three workers (two City of Fernie employees and one CIMCO refrigeration employee from Calgary) during the Ghostriders' regular season. The City of Fernie declared a state of emergency and evacuated the area for days. The team was relocated to the Elk Valley Leisure Centre in Sparwood, British Columbia for the remainder of the 2017–18 KIJHL season. The City of Fernie decided to replace ammonia for a synthetic refrigerant prior to the 2018–19 season, allowing the Fernie Memorial Arena to reopen.

Season-by-season record

Note: GP = Games played, W = Wins, L = Losses, T = Ties, OTL = Overtime Losses, Pts = Points, GF = Goals for, GA = Goals against

Records as of March 3, 2017.

Playoffs

Notes

 The RMJHL playoffs had three playoff rounds.
 The final 1998-99 RMJHL playoffs had two playoff rounds.

Cyclone Taylor Cup

Notes

 The Ghostriders hosted the 2011 Cyclone Taylor Cup, in Fernie, British Columbia, at the Fernie Memorial Arena.

Alumni

Frank Banham
Lloyd Cook
Josh Teves
Wade Dubielewicz
Ron Huston
Jace Coyle
David LeNeveu
Dan Smith
Scott Ford

Captains

Kyle Klein: 2021-22
Sawan Gill: 2020-21
Dylan Defosse: 2019-20
Keelan Saworski: 2018-19
Mitch Titus: 2017-18
Alex Cheveldave: 2016-17
Cole Keebler: 2015-16
Dylan Robertson: 2014-15
Ben Primeau: 2013-14
Josh McKissock: 2012-13
Ty Morton: 2011-12
Thomas Abenante/Jeff Zmurchyk: 2010-11
Tim Crawley: 2009-10
Scotty Traverse: 2007-08; 2008–09
Kiel Klapp: 2005-06; 2006–07
Dean Smith: 2004-05

Awards and trophies

Bourne Cup
1999-00

Gold Cup championship
2002 Bronze medal winners

KIJHL Championship
2006-07
2007-08

Coach of the Year
Craig Mohr: 2004-05 (Divisional)
William Verner: 2007-08 (Divisional)
William Verner: 2009-10 (Divisional)
Craig Mohr: 2014-15 (Divisional)
Jeff Wagner: 2018-19 (Divisional)

Most Sportsmanlike
Martin Crouteau: 2004-05 (Divisional)

Most Valuable Player
Martin Croteau: 2006-07 (Divisional)
Dave McIvor: 2008-09 (Divisional)
Jason Greenwell: 2009-10 (Divisional)
Scott Morisseau: 2010-11 (Divisional and League)

Rookie of the Year
Trevor Hertz: 2006-07 (Divisional)
Brendan Hawryluk: 2009-10 (Divisional)

Top Defenceman
Scott Anderson: 2009-10 (Divisional)
Jeff Zmurchyk: 2010-11 (Divisional and League)

Top Goaltender
Zak Smith: 2005-06 (Divisional)
David Tetrault: 2006-07 (Divisional)
Jason Greenwell: 2009-10 (Divisional and League)
Andrew Walton: 2010-11 (Divisional)
Jeff Orser: 2014-15 (Divisional)
Ethan Fitzgerald: 2019-20 (Divisional)

Top Scorer
Jesse Niemi: 2009-10 (Divisional)
Scott Morisseau: 2010-11 (Divisional and League)

References

External links
 Official website of the Fernie Ghostriders

Ice hockey teams in British Columbia
1991 establishments in British Columbia
Ice hockey clubs established in 1991